Alsodes vanzolinii is a species of frog in the family Alsodidae.

Geographic range
A. vanzolinii is endemic to the western slopes of the Nahuelbuta Range, Arauco Province, Chile.

Habitat
The natural habitats of A. vanzolinii are temperate forests and rivers.

Conservation status
A. vanzolinii is threatened by habitat loss. Alsodes vanzolinii is one of the 18 Alsodes species, 16 of which are present in Chile. Currently, they are considered a critically endangered species by the IUCN (2010) and one of the most threatened Chilean anuran species due to the habitat destruction and expanding exotic tree plantations. It is necessary to increase survey efforts of new populations and how plantation managements, like herbicides and fertilisers are affecting them.

Etymology
The specific name vanzolinii honors Paulo Vanzolini, a Brazilian herpetologist and composer.

References

Further reading
Donoso-Barros R (1974). "Nuevos reptiles y anfibios de Chile ". Boletin de la Sociedad de Biología de Concepción 48: 217–229. (Eupsophus vanzolinii, new species, pp. 226–228, Figure 9). (in Spanish).

vanzolinii
Amphibians of Chile
Endemic fauna of Chile
Amphibians described in 1974
Taxonomy articles created by Polbot